The state flag of Queensland is a British Blue Ensign with the state badge on a white disc added in the fly. The badge is a light blue Maltese Cross with a Saint Edward's Crown in the centre of the cross. The flag dates from 1876, with minor variations, and the badge was designed by William Hemmant, the Colonial Secretary and Treasurer of Queensland in 1876.

Separation flag, 1859 
On 10 December 1859, "a light blue flag with a red St George's Cross and union in the corner" (now known as the Queensland Separation Flag) was flown in Brisbane at eight o'clock in the morning, to mark Queensland's separation from New South Wales.

1870 flag 
The state flag was first created in 1870 with the Union Jack upon the royal blue background; however, the badge was not the current one. In its place was a profile of Queen Victoria on a blue disc surrounded by a white annulus on which the name "QUEENSLAND." was inscribed in gold.

1876 flag 
The next alteration occurred in 1876 as there were many complaints that the reproduction of Victoria's head was too difficult and a replacement was called for. Many complaints by state officials were made, including the example below found in the Queensland State Archives.

The Treasury, Queensland
Brisbane, 15 March 1876,

Referring to the Circular Despatch of the Secretary of State for the Colonies, dated 23 August last, upon the subject of distinctive badges proposed for the Flags of several
Colonies, I have the honour to advise Your Excellency that the difficulty of producing upon
bunting a fair representation of the head or bust of Her Majesty has proved so great, and the
effect, when produced, so unsatisfactory, as to render it necessary to abandon the idea of using
that device for the Queensland Ensign, and I beg therefore to recommend that the
accompanying design, within a wreath of laurel, be adopted for the Flags of the Colony in lieu
of that formerly advised.

I have the honour to be,

Sir,

Your most obedient Servant,
(signed) N Hemmant

His Excellency
WW Cairns, Esq, CMG
Brisbane

The Maltese Cross impaled with the Crown was chosen out of four proposed designs to replace Victoria's head.

1901–1952 flag 
The final official alteration occurred in 1901 with the death of Queen Victoria. The change was in relation to the crown impaled upon the Maltese Cross; as Victoria and Edward VII had chosen different coronation crowns, the crowns upon the badge also had to change. However over the years the monarchs of Australia have chosen differing coronation crowns and therefore, the crowns have unofficially kept up with each change.

Government distribution 
The Queensland Government offers free state flags to eligible organisations including:

 Schools
 Recognised youth organisations
 Community service groups
 Charities
 Sporting clubs
 Local government authorities.

See also 
Coat of arms of Queensland
List of Australian flags
Flags of the governors of the Australian states

References

External links 
 

Society in Queensland
Queensland
Queensland
1876 establishments in Australia
Queensland